The Eisner Award for Best Academic/Scholarly Work is the Eisner Award for "creative achievement" in American comic books for academic publishing. Prior to the creation of the award academic works could be nominated for Best Comics-Related Book.

Name changes

From 2012 to 2013 the award was named Best Educational/Academic Work. From 2014 to 2015 the award was named Best Scholarly/Academic Work. The award took on its current name in 2016.

Winners and nominees

See also
 List of Eisner Award winners

References

External links
 Eisner Award on the comic-con web page

Lists of books
American non-fiction literary awards
Academic/Scholarly Work